Jiří Patera (born February 24, 1999) is a Czech professional ice hockey goaltender for the Henderson Silver Knights of the American Hockey League (AHL), while under contract to the Vegas Golden Knights of the National Hockey League (NHL). He previously played junior in the United States Hockey League (USHL) with the Cedar Rapids RoughRiders and in the Western Hockey League (WHL) with the Brandon Wheat Kings.

Playing career
Patera began his career within the youth system of HC Slavia Praha, before joining the system of ČEZ Motor České Budějovice in 2016–17; shortly thereafter, he was selected in the sixth round of the 2017 NHL Entry Draft by the then-expansion team Vegas Golden Knights. 

He entered junior hockey with the United States Hockey League's (USHL) Cedar Rapids RoughRiders in 2017–18, playing 34 games for the club. He then transitioned to the Canadian junior system, joining the Brandon Wheat Kings of the Western Hockey League (WHL) in 2018–19. Patera spent two years in Brandon, posting a career .913 save percentage and 2.95 goals against average over 89 total games played, while being named Eastern Conference Goaltender of the Year for the 2019–20 WHL season.

Patera signed his three-year entry-level contract with Vegas on 30 June 2020. With the American Hockey League (AHL) season delayed alongside the NHL season due to the COVID-19 pandemic, Patera was loaned to his former Czech club of České Budějovice, where he played 15 games during the 2020–21 Extraliga season. Patera would then join Vegas' AHL affiliate, the Henderson Silver Knights, for the 2020–21 AHL season.

During the  season, with the Golden Knights suffering injuries to multiple goaltenders, Patera was recalled from the Silver Knights in March 2023. He then made his NHL debut on 12 March 2023, posting his first career win and saving 30 of 33 shots faced as the Golden Knights defeated the St. Louis Blues 5–3.

International play
Patera was named to the Czech under-18 team roster for the 2016 Ivan Hlinka Memorial Tournament, but did not play. Patera would later appear for the under-18 team in three games at the 2017 IIHF World U18 Championships, before joining the Czech Republic for the 2019 IIHF World Junior Championships, appearing in one game.

Career statistics

International

Awards and honours

References

External links
 

1999 births
Living people
Brandon Wheat Kings players
Cedar Rapids RoughRiders players
Czech expatriate ice hockey players in the United States
Czech ice hockey goaltenders
Fort Wayne Komets players
Henderson Silver Knights players
Ice hockey people from Prague
Motor České Budějovice players
Vegas Golden Knights draft picks
Vegas Golden Knights players